Madhuca obovatifolia is a species of plant in the family Sapotaceae. It is endemic to the Philippines, where it is confined to Luzon.  It is threatened by habitat loss.

References

obovatifolia
Endemic flora of the Philippines
Taxonomy articles created by Polbot